Just a Walk in the Park is a television film starring George Eads and Jane Krakowski. It premiered on ABC Family in 2002.  It was directed by Steven Schachter.

Plot
When a dog walker agrees to housesit for a wealthy client with a penthouse apartment, he is mistaken for the apartment's owner by a dog-loving neighbor.

Cast
George Eads as Adam Willingford   
Jane Krakowski as Rachel Morgan 
Richard Robitaille as A.J. Preston

External links
 

2002 television films
2002 films
ABC Family original films
Films directed by Steven Schachter
2000s English-language films